Dr. Joseph A. McLean House is a historic home located near Sedalia, Guilford County, North Carolina. It was built about 1850, and is a two-story, three bay, vernacular Greek Revival style dwelling.  The house originated as a two-story log structure and has a one-story gable-roofed rear ell.  The front facade features a massive one-story pedimented portico at the central entrance bay.

It was listed on the National Register of Historic Places in 1995.

References

Houses on the National Register of Historic Places in North Carolina
Greek Revival houses in North Carolina
Houses completed in 1850
Houses in Guilford County, North Carolina
National Register of Historic Places in Guilford County, North Carolina
1850 establishments in North Carolina